Arkem Chemicals (Arkem Kimya Sanayi ve Ticaret A.Ş.) is a family-owned chemical distribution company based in Turkey. It was established in 1992 in Istanbul. The company sells approximately 230,000 metric tons of chemicals (2009) in various chemical product lines including:
 Monomers
 Alcohols
 Aromatics & Aliphatics
 Esters
 Glycols
 Glycol Ethers
 Ketones
 Surfactants
Arkem is the 27th largest chemical distributor in its field(2010) according to "The Top 100 Chemical Distributors" by ICIS. 2009 sales $248m.

The company owns the Altintel Port and Tank Terminal, with a capacity of 60,000 cubic meters of storage area in Kocaeli/Gebze, Dilovası area.

 Millenium Petrochemicals USA (a Lyondell Company)
 BP Chemicals Ltd., UK
 Eastman Chemicals USA
 Arkema, France
 Petrogal S.A., Portugal
 Sasol Solvents, South Africa
 Sasol Surfactants, Germany & Italy
 Shell Chemicals, Europe
 Ineos, UK
 Kuraray, Japan

Related companies 

 Altintel Port and Tank Terminal (Altıntel Liman ve Terminal İşletmeleri A.Ş.)
 Gökbil Logistics (Gökbil Nakliyat ve Depolama)
 Gökbil Tank Container
 Arkem Industrial
 Arkem Europe
 Arkem China
 Arkem USA
 Arkem Germany

See also 
 List of companies of Turkey

External links
Arkem

 

Chemical companies of Turkey
Companies based in Istanbul
Natural gas companies
Non-renewable resource companies established in 1992
Energy companies of Turkey
Turkish companies established in 1992